William Moulton (born 1999), is an English bowls player who won the World Under-25 title at the 2020 World Indoor Bowls Championship and is a junior international.

Moulton attended the University of Southampton and bowls outdoors for the VCD Club and indoors for the Atherley Club.

References

English male bowls players
2000 births
Living people